Title 34 of the United States Code is a non-positive law title of the United States Code with the heading "Crime Control and Law Enforcement."  Released on September 1, 2017, by the Office of the Law Revision Counsel of the United States House of Representatives, it contains "crime control and law enforcement programs or activities in which the Attorney General or the Department of Justice (or one of its components) have been given primary responsibility."  Much of the law transferred to Title 34 were laws editorially classified to sections of Title 42 or set out as notes to Titles 42, 18, and 28.

History
Prior to 1956, Title 34 outlined the role of the United States Navy in the United States Code.  It was repealed on August 10, 1956, by an act of Congress when the laws within it were either eliminated or moved into the new revision of Title 10.

Acts
The Omnibus Crime Control and Safe Streets Act of 1968, as amended, is partly codified to Chapter 101 of Title 34.  

The Violent Crime Control and Law Enforcement Act is partially codified to Chapter 121 of Title 34; however, those portions that amended the Omnibus Crime Control and Safe Streets Act of 1968 are found in Chapter 101 of Title 34, while still other portions of the Act are in the other portions of the U.S. Code or uncodified.  The Violence Against Women Act of 1994 (VAWA) was enacted as Title IV of the Violent Crime Control and Law Enforcement Act.   Where VAWA amended the Omnibus Crime Control and Safe Streets Act of 1968, it can be found at Subchapter XIX of Chapter 101 of Title 34.  Where VAWA did not amend an existing Act or amend a positive law title of the U.S. Code, it can generally be found in Subchapter III of Chapter 121 of Title 34.

The Juvenile Justice and Delinquency Prevention Act of 1974, as amended, is partly codified to Chapter 111 of Title 34.

Some provisions of the Matthew Shepard and James Byrd Jr. Hate Crimes Prevention Act are codified to Chapter 305 of Title 34.

Codes
Subtitle I—Comprehensive Acts (sections §10101—§12643)

Subtitle II—Protection of Children and Other Persons (sections §20101—§21510)

Subtitle III—Prevention of Particular Crimes (sections §30101—§30506)

Subtitle IV—Criminal Records and Information (sections §40101—§41508)

Subtitle V—Law Enforcement and Criminal Justice Personnel (sections §50101—§50503)

Subtitle VI—Other Crime Control and Law Enforcement Matters (sections §60101—§60554)

Subtitle I—Comprehensive Acts

Chapter 101–Justice System Improvement
Subchapter I–Office of Justice Programs
§ 10101. Establishment of Office of Justice Programs
§ 10102. Duties and functions of Assistant Attorney General
§ 10103. Office of Weed and Seed Strategies
§ 10104. Weed and Seed Strategies
§ 10105. Inclusion of Indian tribes
§ 10106. Community Capacity Development Office
§ 10107. Division of Applied Law Enforcement Technology
§ 10108. Availability of funds
§ 10109. Office of Audit, Assessment, and Management
§ 10110. Office of Justice Program grants, cooperative agreements, and contracts
§ 10111. Consolidation of financial management systems of Office of Justice Programs

Subchapter II—National Institute of Justice
§ 10121. Statement of purpose
§ 10122. National Institute of Justice
§ 10123. Authority for 100 per centum grants

Subchapter III—Bureau of Justice Statistics
§ 10131. Statement of purpose
§ 10132. Bureau of Justice Statistics
§ 10133. Authority for 100 per centum grants
§ 10134. Use of data

References

External links
 Cornell Law School (Legal Information Institute, Open access to law since 1992)

34
Repealed United States legislation